Anandavani (ఆనందవాణి) was a popular Telugu magazine.

Overview
It was started as weekly news magazine by Vuppuluri Kalidas in 1939. The first issue was released from Madras with coverpage depicting Rajaji on 2 January. It became very popular during the preindependence period. Malladi, Sripada and Munimanikyam , Sri Sri , Arudra and many others contributed regularly. There used to be lively discussions on many social and political issues supporting Indian independence movement.

It was changed to monthly magazine in 1945. The head office was shifted to Hyderabad in 1960.

Srirangam Srinivasa Rao used to organize "Varam Varam" and "Gallanudikattu" columns. Ravuri Venkata Satyanarayana Rao wrote in Kappu Coffee features. Vyasa Publishing House contributed Ramayana, Mahabharata and Bhagavatam written by C. Rajagopalachari. Famous editor M. Chalapati Rao All-in-All as Endaro Mahanubhavulu.

Arudra, Mahankali Srirama Murthy, Andra Seshagiri Rao, Mudda Viswanadham, Srinivasa Shiromani, Vadali Mandeswara Rao and others worked in the editorial board in different periods.

References

1939 establishments in India
Defunct magazines published in India
Monthly magazines published in India
News magazines published in India
Weekly magazines published in India
Magazines established in 1939
Magazines with year of disestablishment missing
Mass media in Hyderabad, India

Telugu-language magazines